Kingman Township is a township in Kingman County, Kansas, United States.  As of the United States census in 2011, its population was 7,853.

Geography
Kingman Township covers an area of 3.49 square miles (9.03 square kilometers); of this, 0.01 square miles (0.04 square kilometers) or 0.44 percent is water. The stream of North Fork Chikaskia River runs through this township. Kingman country is primarily grassland covering red sand.

Cities and towns
 Kingman (the county seat)

Unincorporated towns
 St. Leo
(This list is based on USGS data and may include former settlements.)

Adjacent townships
 Rural Township (north)
 Union Township (northeast)
 Peters Township (east)
 Rochester Township (southwest)
 Liberty Township (south)

Cemeteries
The township contains three cemeteries: Bross, Walnut Hill, and West Point.

Major highways
 U.S. Route 54
 K-14 (Kansas highway)

Airports and landing strips
 Kingman Municipal Airport

References
 U.S. Board on Geographic Names (GNIS)
 United States Census Bureau cartographic boundary files

External links
 City-Data.com

Townships in Kingman County, Kansas
Townships in Kansas